This is a list of rail accidents since 2020. This list does not contain incidents with singular fatalities of pedestrians who were not in a vehicle.

2020 
 1 January – United States – A BNSF freight train strikes a landslide and derails near Bonner's Ferry, Idaho. Both locomotives end up in the Kootenai River. Two crew are rescued by boat.
 7 January – Mexico – 7 people die and more than 30 are injured when a Ferromex train strikes a bus at a level crossing in Sonora.
 24 January – United States – In Hartford, Connecticut, an Amtrak train collided with a maintenance truck which is stuck on a railroad crossing, the train hit the truck, 6 people were injured.
The cause is a track defect.
 29 January – Australia – A freight train derails near Barnawartha, Victoria and collides with a passenger train coming in the other direction.
 6 February
 Italy – Livraga derailment: A Frecciarossa high-speed train derails at Livraga. Two people are killed and 31 are injured.
 Canada – A Canadian Pacific freight train carrying crude oil derails and catches fire at Guernsey, Saskatchewan. The village is partly evacuated. The Canadian government halves the speed limit for freight trains carrying hazardous materials as a result.
 13 February – United States – Five cars of a 96-car CSX freight train derail in Draffin, Kentucky due to a rockslide. The locomotives and train cars caught fire, causing evacuations of nearby communities. Two crew members from the train were taken to a hospital.
 20 February – Australia – Wallan derailment: Sydney to Melbourne XPT derailed near Wallan, Victoria. Two people were killed, one was airlifted to hospital.

 24 February – Thailand – a freight train from Hat Yai Junction to Bang Sue and a passenger train No.37 collide head on at Pak Tho Railway Station in Ratchaburi at about 18:30. At least 30 are injured.
 28 February – Pakistan – In Sukkur, a train crashed into a bus, there were a total of 20 people aboard the bus, 20 people died and dozens were injured.
 5 March – France – Ingenheim derailment: A TGV derails near Ingenheim, Bas-Rhin due to a landslip. Twenty-two people are injured, one seriously.
 10 March – Mexico – A Mexico City Metro train crashes into another at Tacubaya station. 1 person dies and 41 are injured.
A Class 170 diesel multiple unit collides with the derailed locomotive. No injuries are reported amongst the six people on board.

 27 March – United States – 2020 New York City Subway fire: A series of fires on the IRT Broadway–Seventh Avenue Line and IRT Lenox Avenue Line caused a fire on the 2 train at 110th Street station on the Lenox Avenue Line killing the train operator and injuring 16 other people.
 27 March – United States – In Deland, Florida, an Amtrak Auto Train derailed when 8 train cars tipped over, 1 person was injured.
 30 March – China – A passenger train (Jinan–Guangzhou) derails after colliding with debris on the track due to a landslide in Hunan Province, 1 onboard railroad police officer was killed and 127 people were injured, four severely.
 31 March – United States – A train is intentionally derailed near USNS Mercy in the Port of Los Angeles, though no injuries are reported. The engineer was arrested by federal authorities and charged with train-wrecking.
 3 April – Germany – A freight train collides with a concrete piece of a bridge near a construction site. The engineer is killed and 3 others are injured.
 8 May – India – Aurangabad railway accident: A goods train runs over and kills 16 migrant labourers who were walking to their homes in Madhya Pradesh and slept on the railway tracks, believing that trains would not be running (only passenger trains were stopped, while goods railway services continued to function) due to a nationwide lockdown in the wake of the COVID-19 pandemic.
 22 May – Netherlands – Hooghalen train crash: A passenger train collides with an agricultural vehicle. The train driver dies while two people are injured.
 24 May – Iran – In Tehran, a passenger train travelling from Hamedan to Mashhad derailed in Parand, there were a total of 45 people on the train, 5 people were injured.
 2 June – Spain – A high-speed passenger train collides with a lorry that had fallen from a bridge on to the track at La Hiniesta and derails. Two people are killed.
 7 June – China – Train D1862 traveling between Guangzhou and Chongqing derailed of tunnel between Huaiji county in Guangdong and Hezhou in Guangxi, one passenger was injured and the suspected cause of the derailment was a landside from heavy rain.
In total there are 33 passengers aboard both trains.
 11 July – Bangladesh – In Gazipur, a Dhaka-bound Turna Nishita Train crashed into a bus at around 4:30 AM at a railroad crossing, 2 people were killed and 5 people were injured.
 15 July – Czech Republic – A ČD Class 471 train collides with a freight train at Český Brod. One person is killed and 35 are injured.
 21 July – Australia – In Loftus, New South Wales, a Pacific National train collided with an open engine compartment door from a freight train, which was stationary on an adjacent line. Minor damage was caused to the front of the passenger train, no injuries were reported. The Australian Transport Safety Bureau launched an investigation into the matter.
 29 July – United States – A Union Pacific freight train derails on a bridge in Tempe, Arizona. The wreck catches fire and the bridge collapses.
 31 July – Portugal – Soure train crash: An Alfa Pendular high-speed passenger train derails after collision with a catenary maintenance vehicle. Two people are killed and 43 are injured.

 12 August – United Kingdom – Stonehaven derailment: A ScotRail Inter7City passenger train derails near  following stormy weather killing three people and injuring six.
 19 August – Italy – Carnate derailment: A passenger train runs away crewless from Paderno d'Adda and is derailed at Carnate-Usmate station. Three people are injured.
 27 August – United Kingdom – Llangennech derailment: A freight train derails and catches fire at Llangennech, Carmarthenshire.
 16 September – New Zealand – In Bunnythorpe, a bus crashed into a train at a railroad crossing on the Clevely Line crossing, 1 person was killed and several people were injured.
 20 September – United States – A New York City Subway train derailed after a suspected act of sabotage caused when a man clamped wooden planks onto the roadbed causing the train to derail. Three passengers were injured.
 11 October – United States – In Lilburn, Georgia, a CSX train derails during heavy rains following Hurricane Delta, causing minor injuries to the two occupants of the locomotive.
 11 October – Thailand – A freight train crashed into a bus at a railroad crossing. The bus was headed to a Buddhist temple, 20 people were killed and dozens injured.
 29 October – United States – A 25-car Kansas City Southern freight train derails in Mauriceville, Texas. Five tank cars are punctured and leak their contents, but one tank car contained a 'corrosive material', causing the evacuation of those within a mile (1600 m) of the crash site while those within a half-mile (800 m) of the evacuation zone were told to stay indoors. No injuries were reported.
 2 November – Netherlands – De Akkers metro station crash: A Rotterdam Metro train fails to stop at De Akkers metro station, crashes through a buffer stop and comes to rest partially atop a statue of a whale's tail.
 11 November – United Kingdom – Sheffield Freight Train Derailment: A freight train carrying cement derailed as it passed through Sheffield station causing significant damage to track and wayside equipment.
 28 November – United States – In Wellington, Colorado, a BNSF train collided with an empty train car and derailed with the train wheels of the empty train car which made the BNSF train derail, 1 person was injured.
 
 19 December – United States – 2 people were injured after 2 Dallas Area Rapid Transit trains collided with each other in downtown Dallas. Officials say that the transit's northbound orange line train derailed itself, and collided with a southbound red line train.
 19 December – Bangladesh – In Dhaka, a passenger train crashed into a passenger bus at a railroad crossing, the cause was also caused by a gatekeeper sleeping on his job on time of the train crash. The gatekeeper was later fired, 12 people were killed and 6 people were injured.
 22 December – United States – Near Custer, Whatcom County, Washington, ten railcars of a BNSF train carrying Bukken crude oil derailed, and three cars caught fire. About 120 people in the half-mile (800 m) vicinity were evacuated and Interstate 5 was closed.

2021
 1 February – Canada – A Goderich–Exeter Railway freight train derails at the port of Goderich, Ontario, destroying a heritage building related to the fishing industry.
 7 February – Spain – In Valencia, a passenger train crashed into car at a railroad crossing, 4 people were killed.
 12 February – Canada – A Canadian Pacific Railway freight train carrying potash derails at Crowsnest Pass in the Rocky Mountains. Two locomotives leave the tracks along with at least 48 freight cars, with five cars falling into Crowsnest Lake.
 20 February – Russia – In Skovorodinsky, Amur Oblast, 25 cars of a coal train derail on the Trans-Baikal Railway. There were no injuries.
 6 March – United States – In Front Royal, Virginia, A Norfolk Southern train derails, killing 1.
 7 March – Pakistan – In Sukkur District, Sindh, a train derails, killing one, and injuring over 40 other passengers. The derailment occurred between the Rohri and Sangi railway stations.
Twelve people sustained minor injuries.
 26 March – Egypt – Sohag train collision: A passenger train runs into the rear of a stopped train in Sohag; at least 18 people are killed. Passengers in the first train intentionally applied the emergency brakes, stopping the train, after which the second train hit it from behind.
 31 March – Germany – Two coupled locomotives collide with the locomotive of a freight train near Wolfsburg. The trains had been running parallel before one ran into the side of the other, likely due to an incorrectly set switch, all locomotives were derailed and one overturned, there were no injuries.
 2 April – Taiwan – 2021 Hualien train derailment: A southbound 408 Taroko Express train derails inside the Chingshui Tunnel while approaching Chongde Station north of Hualien City after crashing into a maintenance truck that had rolled down a hill and fell onto the track, killing 49 and injuring 202 people in Taiwan's deadliest rail disaster since 1948.
 4 April – Czech Republic – 2021 Světec train crash: Express freight train No. 54334 of ORLEN Unipetrol Doprava (UNIDO), hauled by locomotive 753.740 collides with ČD Cargo freight train No. 66403, hauled by locomotive 123.023, at Světec Station; the driver of the ČD Cargo train jumps out of the locomotive and survives, but the driver of the UNIDO train dies on impact.
 15 April – Egypt – A passenger train derails in Minya al-Qamh. Fifteen people are injured.
 18 April – Egypt – Toukh train accident: A passenger train derails in Toukh. 23 people are killed and 139 are injured.

 3 May – Mexico – Mexico City Metro overpass collapse: 26 people are killed and 98 are injured when a bridge carrying the Mexico City Metro collapses as a train crosses it.
 24 May – Malaysia – 2021 Kelana Jaya LRT collision: 213 people are injured including 47 seriously when two subway trains collide in Kuala Lumpur near the Petronas Twin Towers.
 4 June – China – A train in Jinchang, Gansu enters an area with rail engineering works ongoing and kills nine track workers.
 7 June – Pakistan – 2021 Ghotki rail crash: The Millat Express, traveling from Karachi to Sargodha, derails between Daharki Station and Reti Station due to a failed weld joint in the rail. A minute after the derailment, the Sir Syed Express, traveling in the opposite direction from Rawalpindi to Karachi, hits the derailed Millat Express; 65 people are killed and around 150 are injured.
 18 June – Australia – In Queensland, a Leto train collided onto an ee16 train, 1 person was killed.
 9 July – Austria – A railcar strikes a fallen tree on the Mur Valley Railway and derails. One of the three carriages ends up on its side in the Mur. Seventeen people are injured.
 15 July – Belgium – A passenger train operated by Siemens Desiro AM08 derails near Grupont due to the trackbed being washed out in severe flooding that affected parts of Belgium, Germany and the Netherlands.
 20 July – China – During the 2021 Henan floods, a Line 5 Zhengzhou Metro train is trapped in a tunnel by floodwaters. Water enters the train cars and rises to chest height. Although 500 people are rescued, 14 drown.
 23 July – United Kingdom – In Sheffield, United Kingdom, a lorry crashes into a Sheffield Supertram Train #105 and derails, no deaths are reported but one person is injured.
 30 July – United States – Two MBTA Green Line trains collided with each other in downtown Boston. 25 people were reported injured, and one of the drivers was later arrested and charged.
 4 August – Czech Republic – Milavče train crash: A DB Class 233 locomotive (223 066) hauling an international service from Munich to Prague passes a stop signal and collides head-on at Milavče with a ČD Class 844 RegioShark hauling a local service from Plzeň to Domažlice. Three people are killed and 42 are injured.
 26 August – United States – In St Paul, Minnesota, 3 trains (1 Union Pacific, 1 Canadian Pacific, And 1 BNSF) collided onto each other spilling chlorine into the river.
 1 September – New Zealand – a remote-controlled locomotive and the wagon it was shunting plunged into the water at Picton. The wagon was recovered the next day and the locomotive on 3 September.
 5 September – Bangladesh – In Moulibazar, a train collided with a bus stalled on the train tracks, 3 people are dead and 6 people are injured.
 8 September – Turkey – In Istanbul, 2 trains collided onto each other, injuring 7.
 25 September – United States – 2021 Montana train derailment: The eight rear Superliner cars of Amtrak's westbound Empire Builder train 7/27, a doubleheader traveling from Chicago to Seattle derail and tipped over near Joplin, Montana at approximately 3:55 pm local time, located nearly 100 miles (160 km) northeast of Great Falls and 70 miles (112 km) south of the US/Canadian border between Montana and the eastern side of Alberta and western side of Saskatchewan. Out of the 146 passengers and 16 crew members on board, 3 people were killed according to the Liberty County Sheriff's office, and injuring 50 others. Only 7 of them were hospitalized. This accident occurred on a line known as the Hi-Line, a portion of BNSF Railway's Northern Transcon. Service between Shelby, Montana and Minot, North Dakota was suspended and later Empire Builder trips were truncated to Minneapolis.
 8 October – Tunisia – In Carthage Dermech, a commuter train collides with another stopped train, 33 are injured.
 8 October – Japan – In Tokyo, 2 trains derail after a 5.9 magnitude earthquake, 3 are injured.
 12 October – United Kingdom – In the Enfield suburb of London, a London Overground train collides with buffers at Enfield Town Train Station, 2 are reported injured, and about 50 are forced to evacuate the train.
 12 October – United States – In Washington D.C., a Blue Line Washington Metro Train derailed near Arlington Cemetery Station, the train was carrying 400 people, only 187 people evacuate first, no deaths were reported but 1 person was injured.
A total of 14 injured, including a train driver, were taken to hospital, with an additional number of walking wounded.
 16 November – Greece – In Athens, a grinding locomotive train crashed head on head on a subway train near Attiki Train Station, there were 3 people in the grinding locomotive train, 1 person was killed and 2 people were injured.
 9 December – Spain – a passenger train runs into a mudslide between Beasain and Brinkola and is derailed.
 9 December – United States – In Darby, Pennsylvania, a SEPTA trolley train crashes into a CSX train, 6 people were injured.
 19 December – United States – A derailment of 40 Union Pacific cars occurred about a half-mile (800 m) west of Napton, Missouri. All of the cars were carrying wheat.
 22 December – Iran – A Tehran Metro train crashed into another train after passing a red signal, 22 people were injured.

2022
 5 January – South Korea – In Seoul, a KTX Train headed from Busan to Seoul derails in the central part of the country, 7 were injured.
 9 January – United States – A Metrolink train collides with a Cessna 172 Skyhawk at Pacoima, Los Angeles, California, destroying the aircraft. The Skyhawk had suffered an engine failure after take-off from Whiteman Airport, Los Angeles and landed on the railway. The pilot had been rescued from the aircraft prior to the accident.
 13 January – India – Bikaner–Guwahati Express derailment – The Bikaner–Guwahati Express train derailed near Domohani, Mainaguri, Jalpaiguri district. 5 were killed and 45 were injured.
 18 January – Pakistan – In Balochistan Province, a Jaffar Express train was hit by a bomb and derailed, 5 were injured.
 2 February – United States – In Baltimore, Maryland, a passenger train crashed into a car killing local high school football player Lamar Patterson, 1 person was killed and no injuries were reported.
 14 February – Germany – Two Munich S-Bahn trains collide near Ebenhausen-Schäftlarn station, killing at least one person and injuring 14.
 23 February – Australia – In Traveston, Queensland, an Aurizon train derails due to a flood, injuring 1 person.
 8 March – Argentina – A passenger train derails 10 kilometers from Olavarria, Buenos Aires Province. 21 people were slightly injured out of the 479 people on board.
 11 March – Democratic Republic of the Congo – 2022 Lualaba train accident – A train derailed in Lualaba Province killing 61 people.
 16 March – Japan – A Yamabiko train on the Tōhoku Shinkansen derails in Miyagi Prefecture during the 2022 Fukushima earthquake. All 96 occupants on the train evacuated safely.
 21 March – Tunisia – A head-on collision between two passenger trains causes 95 injuries. The accident happened in the morning, in the south of Tunis, near .
 28 March – Nigeria – Abuja–Kaduna train attack: In Kaduna, a passenger train from Abuja to Kaduna is attacked by bandits, who detonate a bomb under the train. Gunshots are also heard. 60 are killed and dozens more injured.
3 April – India – In Maharashtra, a train derailed between Lahavit and Devlali, 2 people were injured.
 4 April – Democratic Republic of the Congo – A train derails in Lualaba Province, killing 7 and injuring 14 more.
 5 April – Hungary – A train collides with a pickup truck. At least five are killed, and at least ten are injured.
 13 April – China – A cargo train on the Daqin railway slips away from main track, and rear-ends another cargo train in Jizhou District, Tianjin.
 9 May – Austria – Münchendorf derailment – In Mödling, a passenger train derails, causing one death and several injuries.
 11 May – United States – In Clarendon Hills, Illinois, a Metra Train crashed into a truck at a railroad crossing, 1 passenger on the train Christina Lopez was fatally ejected from the train and died, and 4 others were injured. The train didn't derail but made a stop at Clarendon Hills station, the truck driver had escaped the truck seconds before the train crashed into the truck. The truck caught on fire and was pulverized when the train crashed into it, 1 person was killed and 4 were injured.
 12 May – United States – A Norfolk Southern train derails, with 20 cars leaving the tracks in Mad River Township, Clark County, Ohio.
 16 May – Spain – A freight train derails and then collides with a passenger train during rush hour in Barcelona. The driver of the passenger train is killed as a result, while over 80 passengers suffer injuries.
 19 May – Germany – Two freight trains collide near Münster, Hesse, killing one of the drivers.
 23 May – United States – In Hainesville, Illinois, a Metra Train crashed into a truck and derailed at a railroad crossing, the train was headed from Fox Lake station to Chicago Union Station, 1 person was killed and 1 person was injured.
 24 May – Germany – In Berlin, a train crashed into a bus at a railroad crossing, the train derailed injuring the train driver and 2 passengers on the train were injured, the bus was only carrying the bus driver who was ejected from the bus after the train hit it, no deaths were reported but 4 people were injured.
 26 May – United States – In Pittsburgh, Pennsylvania, a Norfolk Southern train derailed at the Allegheny River, a part of the train bridge collapsed, 2 people were injured.
 1 June – New Zealand – In Auckland, a Kiwirail locomotive train carrying 3 people derailed rolling onto its side, 3 people were injured.
 3 June – Germany – Garmisch-Partenkirchen train derailment ‒ A double-decker passenger train derails in Bavaria, killing 5 people and injuring 68.
 4 June – China – Guiyang-Guangzhou high-speed railway train D2809 derails as it nears Rongjiang Station in Rongjiang County after hitting a mudslide. The train driver is killed and 13 are reported injured.
 4 June – Slovakia – In Vrutky, a locomotive crashed into a stationary passenger train, 74 people were injured.
 8 June – Iran – 2022 South Khorasan train derailment, a passenger train traveling from Tabas to Yazd crashes into an excavator and derails. 18 are killed and 87 injured.
 13 June – Spain – a locomotive collided with a passenger train in Vila-seca, Catalonia. 22 were injured, five of them critically.
 23 June – Egypt – In Cairo, a freight train going from El-Salam to El-Bostan derailed, 1 person was killed.
 26 June – United States – In Brentwood, California, an Amtrak San Joaquins passenger train collided with a car obstructing a railroad crossing. Three people in the car were killed and two were seriously injured. The train was carrying 89 people who were uninjured.
 27 June – United States – 2022 Missouri train derailment ‒ An Amtrak Southwest Chief passenger train carrying 243 passengers collides with a dump truck obstructing a railroad crossing in Mendon, Missouri, derailing eight cars and two locomotives. Four people were killed (three onboard the train and the truck driver) and another 40 were hospitalized following the derailment.
 27 June – Czech Republic – In Bohumin, a high-speed passenger train crashes into another locomotive, the former's driver was killed and 5 people were injured.
 11 July – United States – In Columbia, South Carolina, a Norfolk Southern Train collided with another train. One of the trains had fuel spills, no deaths were reported but 2 were injured.
 12 July – Australia – In Goornong, Victoria, a V/Line train crashes into a truck and derails. Both the train driver and the truck driver suffer minor injuries, but none of the 40 passengers in the train are injured.
 27 July – Indonesia – 2022 Serang train crash, a train crashes into an odong-odong (a minibus that carries people, most often children, for amusement purposes) carrying 20 people, the odong-odong was traveling from Walantata to Kragilan, the odong-odong driver escaped without injury, 9 people were killed and several were injured.
 30 July – Bangladesh – In Chittagong District, a train crashed into a bus at a railroad crossing, 11 people were killed and 5 people were injured.
 5 August – United States – In Milwaukie, Oregon, a MAX Light Rail Train crashed into a buffer after failing to stop at a train station, 3 people were injured.
 17 August – India – In Maharashtra, a passenger train crashed into a freight train due to signalling issues, 50 people were injured.
18 August – Spain – In Castellón, a train caught on fire while reversing from a wildfire, the train was carrying 48 people, no deaths were reported but 20 people were injured.
 27 August – United States – In Fort Lauderdale, Florida, a Tri-Rail Train Crashed derailed after crashing into a car at a railroad crossing, 8 people were injured.
 31 August – United States – In El Paso, Texas, a Union Pacific Train crashed into a derailment device that was on the train tracks and derailed killing a train conductor named Mario Navarro, one of the derailed train cars had a gas leak, which made nearby houses to evacuate. The train derailed in the Alfalfa Train Yard, 1 person was killed.
 2 September – Egypt – In the Nile Delta, a passenger train crashed into a bus, 3 people died and several people were injured.
 5 September – Australia – In Sydney, a tram operating on the CBD and South East Light Rail crashes into a firetruck responding to an emergency and derails. Three passengers and two firefighters are injured, with one passenger and one firefighter taken to hospital.
 5 September – Hungary – Near Kunfehértó, a train crashed into a car at a railroad crossing, 7 people were killed and 1 person was injured.
 8 September – United States – In Mecca, California, near the Salton Sea, a Union Pacific Train crashed into another Union Pacific Train, it was also claimed that the train crashed into the train cars from behind, 2 people were killed and no injuries were reported.
 9 September – Croatia – In Novska, a freight train crashed into a passenger train at 9:30 PM. 3 people were killed and 11 people were injured.
 11 September – United States – In Florence, South Carolina, a CSX Train crashed into a car at a railroad crossing, 4 people were killed and 1 person was injured.
23 September – United States – In Denver, Colorado, a L Line (RTD) Train derails and splits into 2, 3 people were injured.
24 September  – United States – In Miami-Dade County, Florida, 2 CSX Trains crashed into each other near causing a derailment near Miami International Airport, 4 people were injured.
8 October – United States – In Sandusky, Ohio, a 101 car Norfolk Southern freight train derailed at speed, dropping 20 tanker cars of paraffin wax into a road underpass. 
 15 October – United States – In Chicago, Illinois, a Metra Train crashed into a Chicago Transit Authority bus at a railroad crossing, no deaths were reported but 1 person was injured.
 15 October – United States – In Amite City, Louisiana, an Amtrak Train crashed into a truck at a railroad crossing, the accident happened around 1:19 PM, there were 208 people aboard the train but the train driver was injured and taken to the hospital, no deaths were reported but 1 person was injured.
 16 October – United States – In Philadelphia, Pennsylvania, a PATCO Speedline Train crashed into 2 people who were working on the Ben Franklin Bridge, 2 people were killed and no one was injured.
 17 October – United States – In Waterbury, Connecticut, a Metro-North Railroad Train crashed into a semi truck at a railroad crossing, 9 people were injured.
 21 October – United States – In Stonington, Illinois, a Norfolk Southern Train had derailed after crashing into rail equipment at a railroad crossing, 1 person was killed.
 27 October – United States – In Branson, Missouri, a Silver Dollar City Amusement Park passenger train had derailed, injuring 7 people.
 1 November – United States – In Ravenna Township, Ohio, 22 cars of a 237 car Norfolk Southern freight train derailed, causing damage to lineside property. 
 3 November – United States – In Baltimore, Maryland, a Baltimore Light RailLink Train was hijacked by Aidan Mcdonnell, the train switched onto another track at 4:15 PM, at 5:00 PM the stolen train crashed into a southbound train. The train Mcdonnell was driving was empty, Mcdonnell was later charged and arrested, several people were injured.
 5 November – South Korea – In Seoul, a Korail Train had derailed with 275 people on board. The train was heading to Iksan station in North Jeolla Province. The accident happened at 8:15 PM, 30 people were injured.
 21 November – India – In Odisha, a freight train derails at Korai railway station, 3 were killed and 2 were injured
 28 November – United States – In Clewiston, Florida, a frieght train derailed after crashing into a truck, 1 person was killed and no one was injured.
 1 December – Canada – Near Macoun, Saskatchewan, a Canadian Pacific train derailed and several tanker cars caught fire, leading to the evacuation of a small number of homes and an emergency response from the Saskatchewan Public Safety Agency and the RCMP.
 7 December – Spain – Montcada i Reixac rail crash – Two trains collided near Barcelona, injuring 155 people.
 18 December – Indonesia – 2022 Cempaka Mekar derailment, In Cempaka Mekar, West Java, a freight train derailed due to work negligence, 2 people were killed and 5 people were injured.
 20 December – United States – In Collegedale, Tennessee, a Norfolk Southern Train derailed after striking a truck at a railroad crossing, the truck was carrying a 134-foot-long (41 m) concrete beam, no deaths were reported but 2 railway employees were injured.
 25 December – Serbia – In Pirot, a freight train carrying ammonia derailed causing the ammonia to leak. As a result, 2 people died and 51 were hospitalized.
26 December – In Baltimore, Maryland, a subway train partially derailed at 6:00 PM, no deaths were reported but 5 people were injured.
 29 December – Netherlands – In Limburg, a passenger train crashed into a truck and derailed at a railroad crossing, 1 person was killed and 3 people were injured.

2023
 2 January – India – In Rajasthan, a Suryanagri Express Train derails around 03:27 local time, no deaths were reported but 26 people were injured.
 7 January – Mexico – 2023 Mexico City Metro train crash: A Mexico City Metro train rear-ends another train between Potrero and La Raza stations along Line 3, 1 person was killed and 57 people were injured.
 20 January – Austria – Two freight trains collide in Furnitz, Carinthia, spilling approximately 60,000 liters of kerosene. One of the trains burst into flames afterwards. Both train drivers had minor injuries.
 28 January – United States – In Keachi, Louisiana, a Union Pacific train derails, spilling more than 10,000 US gallons (38,000 L) of acid products, leading to the evacuation of part of the town. 16 cars total derail, with 2 of the 16 leaking the chemicals. Officials reported 10,000 US gallons of acetic anhydride and less than 1,000 US gallons (3800 L) of propionic acid were spilled.
 1 February – United States – In Detroit, Michigan, a train derails on a bridge, causing train cars to hang over a street below.
 3 February – United States – 2023 Ohio train derailment: In East Palestine, Ohio a Norfolk Southern freight train derails and spills toxic chemicals, primarily vinyl chloride and butyl acrylate. The crash resulted in the evacuation of the area and activation of the Ohio National Guard.
 13 February – United States – In Splendora, Texas, a train derails after crashing into an 18-wheeler that was attempting to cross the tracks. The truck was dragged half a mile (800 m) down the tracks, killing the driver. The truck spilled diesel fuel, no reported leaks from the train cars per hazmat crews.
 28 February – Greece – Tempi train crash: Outside Larissa, a Hellenic Train passenger train collides head-on with a freight train, killing at least 57 people and injuring over 85 people.
 4 March – United States – Near Springfield, Ohio, approximately 28 cars of a 212-car Norfolk Southern train derail at a State Route 41 crossing, downing power lines and leaving over 1,500 residents without power.
 7 March – Egypt – Two people were killed and 16 others injured after a passenger train crashed into a station platform in Qalyub.
 8 March – United States – Near Sandstone, West Virginia, 4 engines and 22 cars of an empty CSX coal train derailed after colliding with a rockslide that was blocking the track, injuring the 3 crew members that were onboard. One engine ended up in the New River, spilling "an unknown amount" of diesel fuel.
 9 March – Nigeria – A train crashed into a Lagos State Government staff bus at the Shogunle Level Crossing in Lagos killing six and injuring 97.

References 

Rail accidents 2020-2029
21st-century railway accidents
2020s in rail transport
Rail accidents